The Coiled-Coil Domain Containing Protein – 25 (CCDC25) is a human protein whose function is not presently understood.

Gene 

The gene encoding the CCDC25 protein is located at 8p21.1, on the short arm of human chromosome 8, and is transcribed into an mRNA product approximately 3,583 nucleotides in length.

Protein

General 
The protein is highly conserved among mammals as well as eukaryotes as diverse as Arabidopsis thaliana.  CCDC25 is made up of a single polypeptide chain 208 amino acids in length and is expressed at a high level, nearly 4.2 times that of a normal human protein.  Its expression is nearly ubiquitous in human tissues with little indication that its expression level changes drastically in diseased tissues.  Despite currently lacking a well understood function, CCDC25 is predicted to localize to the nucleus and was shown by a microarray experiment to be upregulated in Metaphase II oocytes.

Interactions 
CCDC25 was shown by a yeast-two-hybrid assay to interact with Smad2, a latent transcription factor that is part of the TGF-β signaling pathway. The protein is a predicted substrate of Casein Kinase 1, Casein Kinase 2, cGMP-dependent protein kinase, and the Insulin Receptor; all of which have well defined roles in cell signaling.

References

Further reading